†Mautodontha saintjohni was a species of small air-breathing land snails, terrestrial pulmonate gastropod mollusks in the family Charopidae.

This species was endemic to French Polynesia. It is now extinct.

References 

Mautodontha
Extinct gastropods
Gastropods described in 1976
Taxonomy articles created by Polbot